Human Affairs is a philosophy journal, published by the Slovak Academy of Sciences. It was founded in 1990. The journal focuses on contemporary human affairs, with the goal to advance human self-understanding and communication. It publishes articles in English.

External links 
 Human Affairs online

Social philosophy journals
English-language journals
Publications established in 1990